Cawton is a village and civil parish in the Ryedale district of North Yorkshire, England, about ten miles west of Malton.  According to the 2001 census it had a population of 48. It is due east of Gilling East (where the 2011 Census figures are included), and south-east of Oswaldkirk. It is on the path of the Ebor Way.

References
visionofbritain.org.uk, Cawton, North Riding.

External links

Villages in North Yorkshire
Civil parishes in North Yorkshire